Tomasz Dejewski (born 22 April 1995) is a Polish professional footballer who plays as a centre-back for II liga club Radunia Stężyca.

Career statistics

References

External links

1995 births
Living people
Polish footballers
Association football defenders
Olimpia Grudziądz players
Lech Poznań II players
Warta Poznań players
Lech Poznań players
Widzew Łódź players
Ekstraklasa players
I liga players
II liga players
III liga players